Intelligent design is the belief that nature shows evidence of being caused by an intelligent creator, not an undirected process such as natural selection.

Intelligent design may more specifically refer to:

 The teleological argument, the theological argument for the existence of God sometimes called the "argument from intelligent design"
 Intelligent design in politics
 The Intelligent design movement
 The Intelligent design network, a nonprofit organization to promote Intelligent Design

Books and music 
 Intelligent Design (book), a 1999 work by William A. Dembski
 Intelligent Design: Message from the Designers, a religious text in Raëlism
 Intelligent Design (album), an album by Cesium 137
 The Intelligent Design Of..., an album by Joan of Arc

See also 
 The Theory of Intelligent Design, a 2006 album by Fish Karma
 Intelligent designer